Édouard Gustave Charles Marie Pecher (24 November 1885 – 27 December 1926) was a Belgian lawyer and liberal politician. He was president of the Liberal Party from 1921 until 1926.

Pecher was a doctor in law and became a member of parliament (1912–1919 and 1921–1926) for the district Antwerp. He was for a short while minister of colonies for Belgian Congo (1926). From 1924 up to 1926, he was President of the Liberal Party.

His son was Charles Pecher.

Sources

Further reading
 Liberal Archive
 Th. Luykx, M. Platel, Politieke geschiedenis van België, 2 vol., Kluwer, 1985
 E. Witte, J. Craeybeckx, A. Meynen, Politieke geschiedenis van België, Standaard, 1997
Presidents of the Belgian liberal party

1885 births
1926 deaths

Flemish politicians
Politicians from Antwerp
Liberal Party (Belgium) politicians
Members of the Belgian Federal Parliament
Government ministers of Belgium